HMS Ajax was a Leander-class light cruiser which served with the Royal Navy during World War II. She became famous for her part in the Battle of the River Plate, the Battle of Crete, the Battle of Malta and as a supply escort in the siege of Tobruk. This ship was the eighth in the Royal Navy to bear the name. In February 1942, she was adopted by the civil community of Halifax.

Prewar and first actions
Ajax was built at Vickers' shipyard, in Barrow-in-Furness, England. She was laid down on 7 February 1933, launched on 1 March 1934 and completed on 12 April 1935. She was commissioned for service on the North America and West Indies Station, but after working up in May 1935, she was deployed instead to the Mediterranean on detached service after the Abyssinian crisis. This lasted until November when she finally joined her squadron in Bermuda. Until 1937 she undertook exercises and visits to ports in the Americas. At the end of her West Indies deployment, Ajax returned to Britain for refit. At this time, her 4" battery was upgraded by exchanging single for double mountings.

She rejoined her squadron in the West Indies in February 1938 and remained on that station until 1939 when she was redeployed to the Pacific, off South America. On 27 January, Ajax went to assist the rescue of earthquake victims at Talcahuano, in Chile. She then returned to Bermuda and was redeployed to the South Atlantic Division in March.

When war was declared in September 1939, Ajax took up her appropriate station and patrolled off the River Plate. There she sank the German merchant ship Olinda on 3 September. She intercepted the German merchantman Carl Fritzen and the passenger ship  (with the cruiser ) on 4 and 5 September, respectively. Both ships were scuttled by their crews to avoid being taken as prizes.

After a brief deployment in and around the Falkland Islands, Ajax returned to her station off the Plate on 21 September.

The hunt for Admiral Graf Spee 

(Cumberland, also part of this force, was undergoing a refit at Port Stanley). Force G located and engaged  Graf Spee on 13 December, despite the German warship's greater firepower. Ajax was hit seven times by the Germans: X and Y turrets were disabled, structural damage was sustained and there were 12 casualties including 7 killed. Exeter, more severely damaged, retired, leaving the two light cruisers to maintain contact with Graf Spee when she withdrew to Montevideo. The reasons for the German ship's withdrawal and her failure to exploit her advantage are unclear, but there was damage to her bows, that affected her sea-worthiness, and to her fuel systems. Ajax and Achilles, joined by Cumberland, awaited events and successfully bluffed the Germans into believing that a superior force was on hand. Graf Spee was scuttled by her own crew. Ajax refuelled at Port Stanley and resumed her patrol.

In January 1940, she returned to Britain for refit, via Montevideo, Rio de Janeiro and Freetown, Sierra Leone. Ajax arrived at Plymouth at the end of January; the following month, she was handed over to Chatham Dockyard for refit.

Mediterranean, Crete and North Africa 
Once refitted and worked up, Ajax became ready for service in August 1940. Her refit had included the addition of a Type 279 Radar, a tripod mast and zarebas for the 4" batteries.

In August 1940, Ajax was allocated to the 7th Cruiser Squadron for Mediterranean service (France had fallen and Italy was now a belligerent with a significant navy). She sailed from Britain on 21 August as part of the escort (with ), to a convoy for Egypt routed via the Mediterranean (Operation Hats), but she remained with a portion that was diverted via Durban. In late September, she escorted a troop convoy (and ) from Aden to Suez. Ajax joined  at Alexandria on 30 September.

From 2 to 16 October, Ajax was engaged in major fleet manoeuvres to interdict Italian convoys to Libya and to protect British convoys to Malta. Firstly, she sailed with the fleet to search for Italian convoys, possibly with their own fleet escorts. On 8 October, Ajax again deployed with a major naval force  to cover the passage to Malta of convoy MF3 (Operation MB6). Ajax and Orion patrolled south-east of Malta before covering the return of Convoy MF4 to Alexandria on 12 October. (The main fleet was deployed to the west of the convoy).

During the night of 11–12 October, Ajax intercepted a small Italian force. Two more warships escaped into a smoke screen. Ajax herself was hit by seven shells that destroyed one of her whalers, caused severe damage to the bridge and radar installation and 35 casualties, including 13 killed. She returned to Alexandria on 16 October.

At the end of October, Ajax set out on the first of two operations to carry troop reinforcements to Suda Bay, on Crete in Operation Barbarity; she suffered near misses from air attacks. On her return to the fleet on 6 November, she helped to provide cover for a Malta convoy, MW3. This was a large operation, involving most of the Mediterranean Fleet and part of a wider set of ship movements, Operation Coat. She was part of Force X which was detached from the main fleet on 11 November to sortie into the Straits of Otranto, between Italy and Albania, to provide a diversion and give cover for the successful naval air attack on Taranto.

On 12 November, after turning to return to the main fleet, they intercepted a small convoy of four Italian merchant ships escorted by naval auxiliary   and the obsolete torpedo-boat . Ramb III fired 19 salvos in its own defense and succeeded in breaking away without suffering any damage. Nicola Fabrizi stayed with the merchant ships and attacked the British forces. As a result, Nicola Fabrizi was hit immediately and suffered serious damage. The Italian torpedo boat continued to fight until it was unable to fight any more and retired badly damaged. After Nicola Fabrizi was neutralized, the British force divided up the targets and sank all four of the Italian merchant ships. This action took place near the Strait of Otranto (see Battle of the Strait of Otranto (1940)).

Force X also bombarded the port of Durazzo (now Durres) and set the oil refinery on fire. before it rejoined the fleet. Ajax and other vessels were detached from the fleet and refuelled at Suda Bay before they returned to Alexandria.

From 15 to 20 November, Ajax and four other cruisers  transported troops from Alexandria to Piraeus, the port of Athens, and returned to Alexandria. On 23 November, she was deployed with Force B  to cover a convoy to Crete and to support air attacks on Tripoli from Eagle.

Ajax participated in the Battle of Cape Matapan and was hit by bombs from Ju 87s on 21 May 1941. She evacuated many troops from Crete up until 29 May. She then covered Syrian operations in June and joined Force K at Malta in November, being withdrawn in February 1942 for refit.

Two years out of action (1942 & 1943)
On 6 February she departed Suez for the United Kingdom via the Cape of Good Hope, calling at Mombasa (9 March) and Freetown (9 April), arriving in the Clyde on 14 April. On 6 June, she was taken in hand for refit at Chatham Dockyard, which lasted until September. Her anti-aircraft (AA) gunnery was augmented by eleven Oerlikon 20 mm cannons. Various radar sets were also installed; fire control radars for her main guns (Type 284), AA armament (Type 285) and barrage control (Type 283); an improved aircraft warning radar (the Type 281, replaced the Type 279), surface warning radar was also fitted, (the Type 272). Her aircraft facilities were removed. Ajax underwent post refit trials in October and after being recommissioned on 24 October, she worked-up at Scapa Flow with the Home Fleet during November. On 31 December, she joined Force Q at Bône, in Algeria for the interdiction of enemy convoys and convoy defence.

Ajax was disabled by a  bomb—dropped by an aircraft from II./SKG 10 or II./StG 3— hitting "B" boiler room on 1 January 1943 while at Bône, after convoy escort duty; she was towed on 7 January to Gibraltar for temporary repairs, which continued into February. Permanent repairs were arranged to take place in the United States and she was taken in hand at Norfolk Navy Yard, Virginia; these lasted until September. During repair work, Ajax was equipped with US quadruple 40mm anti-aircraft mountings with provision for a British fire control radar Type 282, IFF Type 242 fitted and a US fire control radar replaced her existing Type 284. After post refit trials in October, she returned to Britain, via Bermuda, in November and the fitting of British equipment was completed. Ajax was recommissioned at Portsmouth on 25 December and joined the Home Fleet at Scapa Flow once more for work-up before returning to the Mediterranean in February 1944 after nearly two years out of action – apart from just a couple of days in January 1943.

D-Day and post war 

As part of Force K, Ajax bombarded Gold Beach during the D-Day invasion; the battery at Longues gave some trouble but was silenced by 6-inch shells through the embrasures of two of the four casemates. She later supported the landings in southern France. Ajax also operated in the Aegean during the reoccupation of Athens and the communist uprising in Greece.

After the war, Ajax was used to repatriate German sailors from the crew of Admiral Graf Spee from Uruguay back to Germany – a historic irony since Ajax had been a member of the squadron that battled the German ship in 1939 and ultimately caused her to be scuttled. Ajax was then assigned to the Royal Navy Palestine Patrol and took part in the efforts to halt illegal Jewish immigration to Palestine. In July 1947 it took part in the Exodus 1947 incident, in which she formed part of the Royal Navy task force which subdued the illegal immigrant ship and later escorted it back to Germany.

Final disposition 

Ajax was decommissioned in February 1948. Sales to the Chilean Navy or Indian Navy were mooted, but this latter deal did not materialize due to Winston Churchill's apparent disapproval of the sale; he felt that such an important vessel would be better off broken up to preserve her history. After running aground at Newport, Monmouthshire, on 9 November 1949 while under tow to the scrapyard, she was refloated and duly arrived at Cashmore's, in Newport, South Wales, for breaking up on 18 November 1949.

Ajax remembered 
The town of Ajax, in Ontario, Canada, was named after the cruiser following the Battle of the River Plate. The town also has streets named after every member of the ship's company, such as Hobson Avenue, and Harwood Avenue, which is the town's main north-south street. Many street signs in the town bear the silhouette of the ship. The silhouette signifies the street being named after part of the ship's company, and the ship's anchor rests in front of the local branch of the Royal Canadian Legion.

Calle Exeter was named in honor of the ship, after HMS Exeter and HMS Ajax provided assistance to the citizens of Concepción, following the 1939 Chillán earthquake.

Ajaxs bell is on a monument in Montevideo, just outside the port customs house, and was donated by Admiral Sir Henry Harwood and Sir Eugen Millington-Drake in 1949.

Ajax Icefall at the head of Visca Anchorage, King George Island, in the South Shetland Islands is named for HMS Ajax, which assisted in the search for a boat crew from the Discovery II, missing on King George Island in January 1937.

In popular culture 
The author Warren Tute's service on HMS Ajax during the 1930s formed the background for his novel The Cruiser.  Like Ajax, the novel's fictional HMS Antigone was a Leander-class light cruiser which was based on the North America and West Indies Station before World War II and saw action in the Mediterranean. The novel paints a realistic picture of life on a cruiser.

Notes

Footnotes

References

External links

External links

 HMS Ajax at Crete 

 

Battle of the River Plate
Leander-class cruisers (1931) of the Royal Navy
Naval ships of Operation Neptune
Ships built in Barrow-in-Furness
1934 ships
World War II cruisers of the United Kingdom